The Competitive Enterprise Institute (CEI) is a non-profit libertarian think tank founded by the political writer Fred L. Smith Jr. on March 9, 1984, in Washington, D.C., to advance principles of limited government, free enterprise, and individual liberty. CEI focuses on a number of regulatory policy issues, including business and finance, labor, technology and telecommunications, transportation, food and drug regulation, and energy and environment in which they have promoted climate change denial. Kent Lassman is the current President and CEO.

According to the 2017 Global Go To Think Tank Index Report (Think Tanks and Civil Societies Program, University of Pennsylvania), CEI was number 59 (of 90) in the "Top Think Tanks in the United States".

Policy areas

Energy and environment 

Academic research has identified CEI as one of the Conservative think tanks funded to overturn the environmentalism of the 1960s, central to promoting climate change denial. It was involved in assisting the anti-environmental climate change policy of the George W. Bush administration. CEI promotes environmental policies based on limited government regulation and property rights and rejects what it calls "global warming alarmism". The organization's largest program, the Center for Energy and Environment, focuses on energy policy, chemical risk policy, Clean Air Act regulation, land and water regulation, the Endangered Species Act, and private conservation policies.

CEI is an opponent of government action by the Environmental Protection Agency that would require limits on greenhouse gas emissions. It favors free-market environmentalism, and supports the idea that market institutions are more effective in protecting the environment than is government. CEI President Kent Lassman wrote on the organization's blog that, "there is no debate about whether the Earth's climate is warming", that "human activities very likely contribute to that warming", and that "this has long been the CEI's position". In March 1992, CEI's founder Fred Smith said of anthropogenic climate change: "Most of the indications right now are it looks pretty good. Warmer winters, warmer nights, no effects during the day because of clouding, sounds to me like we're moving to a more benign planet, more rain, richer, easier productivity to agriculture."

In May 2006, CEI's global warming policy activities attracted attention as it embarked upon an ad campaign with two television commercials. These ads promote carbon dioxide as a positive factor in the environment and argue that global warming is not a concern. One ad focuses on the message that CO2 is misrepresented as a pollutant, stating that "it's essential to life. We breathe it out. Plants breathe it in... They call it pollution. We call it life." The other states that the world's glaciers are "growing, not melting... getting thicker, not thinner." It cites Science articles to support its claims. However, the editor of Science stated that the ad "misrepresents the conclusions of the two cited Science papers... by selective referencing". The author of the articles, Curt Davis, director of the Center for Geospatial Intelligence at the University of Missouri, said CEI was misrepresenting his previous research to inflate their claims. "These television ads are a deliberate effort to confuse and mislead the public about the global warming debate," Davis said.

In 2009, CEI's director of energy and global warming policy told The Washington Post, "The only thing that's been demonstrated to reduce emissions is economic collapse". In 2014, CEI sued the White House Office of Science and Technology Policy over a video that linked the polar vortex to climate change.

Regulatory reform

CEI advocates for regulatory reform on a range of policy issues, including energy, environment, business and finance, labor, technology and telecommunications, transportation, and food and drug regulation.

Its annual survey of the federal regulatory state  "Ten Thousand Commandments: An Annual Snapshot of the Federal Regulatory State," documents the size, scope, and cost of federal regulations, and how the U.S. regulatory burden affects American consumers, businesses, and the economy. CEI's Clyde Wayne Crews Jr. coined the phrase "regulatory dark matter," referencing astrophysics to distinguish between ordinary government regulations or "visible matter," and "regulatory dark matter," which consists of  "thousands of executive branch and federal agency proclamations and issuances, including memos, guidance documents, bulletins, circulars and announcements with practical regulatory effect."

Technology and telecommunications
In 2015, CEI filed an amicus brief in support of the petitioners in U.S. Telecom v. FCC. The brief argued that, "Congress did not authorize the FCC to regulate the Internet when it enacted Section 706 of the Telecommunications Act [of 1996] and, in fact, placed it outside the scope of the FCC's rulemaking authority."

CEI was one of several free-market think tanks who publicly supported the Federal Communications Commission's Restoring Internet Freedom Order in 2017, which repealed net neutrality regulations implemented under the Obama Administration. CEI has argued against using antitrust regulation to break up big technology companies such as Facebook and Google.

Capitalism
CEI has a longstanding project to recapture what they term "the moral legitimacy of capitalism" through research, writing, events, and other outreach activities. In 2019, CEI's vice president for
Strategy Iain Murray argued, in an op-ed for The Wall Street Journal, that advocates of capitalism and free markets had taken the support of social
conservatives for granted.

Legal advocacy
The Competitive Enterprise Institute "is one of a small number of think tanks that have a litigation arm to their organization, according to an editorial in the Wall Street Journal. ."

Center for Class Action Fairness (former project) 
From 2015 to 2019, the Center for Class Action Fairness (CCAF) was part of CEI. It has since spun off as part of the new Hamilton Lincoln Law Institute, a free-market nonprofit public-interest law founded by Frank and his CCAF colleague Melissa Holyoak. CCAF represents class members against what it calls, "unfair class action procedures and settlements."

CEI argued Frank v. Gaos before the U.S. Supreme Court on October 31, 2018, opposing a proposed class action settlement involving Google, who paid out an $8.5 million settlement including $6 million in cy-près funds and more than $2 million for class-action lawyers. Class members were not awarded any part of the settlement.

In 2015, CEI successfully appealed a class action settlement in a case about the length of Subway's "footlong" sandwiches. CEI argued that the proposed settlement benefited only nine people in the class but awarded more than half a million dollars to the class attorneys. The Seventh Circuit's ruling rejected the settlement in the Subway case that would have paid plaintiffs' attorneys $525,000 and left the class with nothing. The court's decision included the statement that "[a] class settlement that results in fees for class counsel but yields no meaningful relief for the class is no better than a racket."

Challenges to the Affordable Care Act
CEI funded and coordinated King v. Burwell and Halbig v. Burwell, two lawsuits that challenged the Internal Revenue Service's implementation of the Affordable Care Act. The strategy of bringing such lawsuits was pioneered by Michael S. Greve, former chairman of CEI's board of directors, who stated:  "This bastard [the act] has to be killed as a matter of political hygiene.  I do not care how this is done, whether it's dismembered, whether we drive a stake through its heart, whether we tar and feather it, and drive it out of town, whether we strangle it." The King v. Burwell suit alleged that the IRS's implementation violated the statute and sought to block "a major portion of Obamacare: the subsidies that more than 6 million middle-income people, across more than 30 states, now receive to buy health insurance." CEI general counsel Sam Kazman argued in a USA Today op-ed that the disputed IRS rule "raises a basic issue that goes far beyond Obamacare: Do agencies have to follow the laws enacted by Congress, or can they rewrite them?" The case made its way to the Supreme Court, which is a 6–3 decision rejected the challenge and upheld the ACA subsidies.

Challenges to the Dodd-Frank Act and financial regulation
In 2012, the CEI, along with the conservative activist group 60 Plus Association, filed a lawsuit against the Consumer Financial Protection Bureau (CFPB). The CEI's suit alleges that the Dodd-Frank Wall Street Reform and Consumer Protection Act's creation of the CFPB violates the constitutional separation of powers. The CEI also contends that President Obama's recess appointment of Richard Cordray as CFPB director was unconstitutional and that the powers of the Financial Stability Oversight Council, created by Dodd-Frank, are unconstitutional.  In 2016, a federal judge rejected the challenge to Cordray's appointment. The CEI's challenge to the constitutionality of CFPB remains pending in the federal courts.

CEI events
Every year CEI hosts an annual dinner gala and presents the Julian L. Simon Memorial Award. The Simon award honors the work of the late economist, winner of the Simon–Ehrlich wager. Award winners have included:

CEI projects

Warren T. Brookes Journalism Fellowship
In 1991, CEI established the Warren T. Brookes Journalism Fellowship to identify and train journalists who wish to improve their knowledge of environmental issues and free-market economics. In this manner, the program seeks to perpetuate the legacy of Warren Brookes, who was a longtime journalist with the Boston Herald and the Detroit News and a nationally syndicated columnist.  Former and current fellows include:

Bureaucrash
Bureaucrash was a special outreach and activist project of CEI described as an international network of pro-freedom activists working to promote a political ideology based on personal and economic freedom. It conducted political activism using new media, creative marketing, and education campaigns. The project maintained a website (bureaucrash.com) and a YouTube channel, Bureaucrash TV, which featured short videos on political topics. Begun as an independent organization, Bureaucrash was absorbed into CEI and, for a time, maintained full-time staff as part of CEI's staff. In mid-2010 Bureaucrash transferred its only full-time staffer to an open position on CEI's communications staff leaving Bureaucrash itself without any full-time staff.

Funding
CEI is funded by donations from individuals, foundations and corporations. Donors to CEI include a number of companies in the energy, technology, automotive, and alcohol and tobacco industries.

CEI's revenues for the fiscal year ending on September 30, 2015, were $7.5 million against expenses of $7.4 million. ExxonMobil Corporation was a donor to CEI, giving the group about $2 million over seven years. In 2006, the company announced that it had ended its funding for the group.

See also
 Donors Trust

References

External links
 
 CEI blog
 GlobalWarming.org Cooler Heads Coalition homepage
 EDIRC listing (provided by RePEc)
 Organizational Profile – National Center for Charitable Statistics (Urban Institute)

 
Organizations of environmentalism skeptics and critics
Think tanks established in 1984
Non-profit organizations based in Washington, D.C.
Think tanks based in Washington, D.C.
Political advocacy groups in the United States
Political and economic think tanks in the United States
Libertarian think tanks
Conservative organizations in the United States
1984 establishments in Washington, D.C.